Oliver Hirschbiegel (born 29 December 1957) is a German film director. His works include Das Experiment and the Oscar-nominated Downfall.

Life and career
Hirschbiegel was born in Hamburg, Germany. A Waldorf graduate, Hirschbiegel studied painting and graphic arts, later film, at the Hamburg University of Fine Arts. In 1986, he directed his first film, the made-for-TV movie Das Go! Projekt, the script for which he had written himself. He became a successful TV director, directing numerous episodes of the Tatort and Kommissar Rex series. His first theatrical release was the well-received movie Das Experiment.

In 2004, he attracted world-wide attention with the film Der Untergang (released in English-speaking countries as Downfall), produced by Bernd Eichinger. It recounts Adolf Hitler's last days, and sparked an extensive debate in Germany over the portrayal of Nazi leaders. The film was a critical and commercial success, winning numerous awards and a nomination for the Academy Award for the best foreign film. One scene from the film has become the basis for a widespread viral video phenomenon. Before directing the film, he was in talks to direct Blade: Trinity.

He directed his first Hollywood feature The Invasion, which was partly re-shot by Australian director James McTeigue, at the request of the studio.

Hirschbiegel directed the biographical film Diana, about Diana, Princess of Wales, which was released in September 2013. Actress Naomi Watts plays the title role.

His film 13 Minutes was selected to be screened out of competition at the 65th Berlin International Film Festival.

Oliver's brother Urs is an assistant director and producer.

Filmography
 Trickser (1997, TV film)
  (1997, TV film)
 Mortal Friends (1998, TV film)
 Das Experiment (2001)
  (2002)
 Downfall (2004)
  (2005)
 The Invasion (2007)
 Five Minutes of Heaven (2009)
 Diana (2013)
 13 Minutes (2015)
 Criminal: Germany (2019)
 Das Engelsgesicht (TBA)

Awards
Wins 
 1998 , Best Direction of a TV Film or Series for "Das Urteil" and "Trickser"
 1998 Adolf Grimme Awards, Audience Award of the 'Marl Group' for "Das Urteil"
 1999 Bavarian Film Awards for Directing "Mortal Friends"
 2001 Bergen International Film Festival Audience Award for "Das Experiment"  
 2001 Bavarian Film Awards, Best Direction for Das Experiment  
 2001 Montréal World Film Festival Best Director, "Das Experiment" 
 2002 Istanbul International Film Festival, People's Choice Award, "Das Experiment" 
 2004 Bambi Awards Film – National, "Downfall" 
 2005 Bavarian Film Awards Audience Award for "Downfall" 
 2005 Amanda Awards Best Foreign Feature Film (Årets utenlandske kinofilm), "Downfall" 
 2006 Bodil Awards Best Non-American Film (Bedste ikke-amerikanske film), "Downfall" 
 2006 Fajr International Film Festival International Competition – Best Technical or Artistic Achievement, "Downfall" 
 2006 Robert Award Best Non-American Film (Årets ikke-amerikanske film),  "Downfall" 
 2009 Prix Europa Special Commendation – TV Fiction "Five Minutes of Heaven" 
 2009 Sundance Film Festival Directing Award, World Cinema, Dramatic – "Five Minutes of Heaven"

Nominations

 1998 Adolf Grimme Awards Adolf Grimme Award, Fiction/Entertainment – "Das Urteil" 
 2001 European Film Awards Audience Award, Best Director, "Das Experiment" 
 2002 Fantasporto International Fantasy Film Award, Best Film, "Das Experiment" 
 2003 Paris Film Festival Grand Prix,  "Das Experiment" 
 2005 Mar del Plata Film Festival Best Film,  "Downfall" 
 2005 Academy Awards Best Foreign Language Film of the Year 
 2006 Goya Awards Best European Film (Mejor Película Europea), "Downfall" 
 2006 Argentinean Film Critics Association Awards Best Foreign Film, Not in the Spanish Language (Mejor Película Extranjera), "Downfall" 
 2009 Sundance Film Festival Grand Jury Prize, World Cinema – Dramatic, "Five Minutes of Heaven" 
 2010 Broadcasting Press Guild Awards Broadcasting Press Guild Award, Best Single Drama – "Five Minutes of Heaven"

References

External links

 
 Interview with director Oliver Hirschbiegel

1957 births
Crystal Simorgh recipients
German television directors
Film directors from Hamburg
German-language film directors
Living people
Waldorf school alumni
Christopher Ewart-Biggs Memorial Prize recipients
University of Fine Arts of Hamburg alumni